M-Net Series is a defunct group of television channels broadcast by South African pay TV satellite network M-Net across Sub-Saharran Africa on DStv. Most of the programmes broadcast are repeats of episodes previously shown on M-Net.

History

A single series channel was introduced in 2000 as a sister channel to the original M-Net channel. On 9 July 2013, this channel was split into three, namely M-Net Series Showcase, M-Net Series Reality and M-Net Series Zone. On 11 September 2014, it was announced that Series Showcase and Series Reality would be discontinued and replaced with two new channels, VUZU AMP and M-Net Edge, on 20 and 13 October, respectively.

M-Net Series Showcase, which was broadcast in high definition, previously served as the primary series channel on which most new content unique to Series was broadcast. M-Net Series Reality broadcast talk shows and other reality media. These two channels were discontinued in October 2014, and replaced with two new channels, M-Net Edge and VUZU AMP, which are both broadcast in high definition. M-Net Series Zone currently serves as a catch-up channel, and features previous seasons of shows. Several TV shows also run back-to-back in marathon blocks.

On 9 July 2013, the single M-Net Series channel was split into three channels, namely M-Net Series Showcase, which was broadcast in HD, M-Net Series Reality and M-Net Series Zone. On 11 September 2014, it was announced that Series Showcase and Series Reality would be discontinued and replaced with two new channels, VUZU AMP and M-Net Edge, on 20 and 13 October, respectively. Only one channel of the original three, M-Net Series Zone, remains. The standalone channel is reminiscent of the initial M-Net Series channel, in that it airs shows that previously aired on the main M-Net channel. It was rebranded as M-Net City in 2015.

M-Net Series Channels 
M-Net Edge

VUZU AMP (Previously M-Net Series Showcase & M-Net Series Reality)

M-Net City (Previously M-Net Series Zone)

Broadcasting history 
M-Net is well known for its premium television broadcast of TV shows that are exclusively a first in Africa straight after the U.S broadcast. A well known number of shows have aired spanning from reality shows to drama oriented ones. Pre 2013 the channel was based upon a singular core channel mainly M-Net Series as a stand-alone channel having different blocks to air specific types of shows. Prior to 2013 the channel was split into three channels mostly M-Net Showcase & Reality both having HD capability whilst Zone wasn't upgraded as viewers of the channel experienced SD. With the launch of M-Net Edge the channel only broadcasts in the evenings from 18:30 (CAT).

See also 
DStv
M-Net Literary Awards
1Magic
MultiChoice
Vuzu
M-Net

References

External links 
Official Site (Archived)

Television stations in South Africa
English-language television stations in South Africa
Television channels and stations established in 2013
Television channels and stations disestablished in 2015
Mass media in Johannesburg
M-Net original programming
Defunct mass media in South Africa